Edwin Fitch Northrup (born February 23, 1866 – May 13, 1940) was a professor of physics at Princeton University from 1910 to 1920. He was affiliated with the Leeds & Northrup for about seven years.

He studied at Amherst College and the Johns Hopkins University, where he gained his Ph.D. in physics in 1895. He then became assistant to Prof. Henry Augustus Rowland (died 1901) in the development of telegraph systems and became chief engineer at the newly founded Rowland Printing Telegraph Company. In 1903 he co-founded the Leeds & Northrup with Morris E. Leeds.

He was awarded the Acheson Award by the Electrochemical Society in 1931.

In 1937, Dr. Northrup published the science fiction novel Zero to Eighty under the pseudonym of Akkad Pseudoman.

References

External links

1866 births
1940 deaths
20th-century American novelists
American male novelists
American physicists
American science fiction writers
Princeton University faculty
20th-century American male writers
Novelists from New Jersey